We Are Urusei Yatsura is an album by Scottish indie rock band Urusei Yatsura, released on 6 May 1996. In the U.S.A. it is known as We Are Yatsura.

Track listing
 "Siamese" - 2.38
 "First Day On A New Planet" - 3.33
 "Pow R. Ball" - 2.30
 "Kewpies Like Watermelon" - 2.35
 "Phasers On Stun / Sola Kola" - 3.07
 "Black Hole Love" - 5.13
 "Velvy Blood" - 2.57
 "Plastic Ashtray" - 2.53
 "Death 2 Everyone" - 2.48
 "Pachinko" - 3.52
 Untitled - 0.23
 "Kernel" - 3.35
 "Road Song" - 6.35

References

1996 albums
Urusei Yatsura (band) albums